Rees Tate Bowen (January 10, 1809 – August 29, 1879) was a nineteenth-century American congressman, magistrate and judge from Virginia. He was the father of Henry Bowen.

Biography
Born at "Maiden Spring" near Tazewell, Virginia, Bowen attended Abingdon Academy and later engaged in agricultural pursuits. He was appointed a brigadier general in the Virginia Militia by Governor Henry A. Wise in 1856 and served in the Virginia House of Delegates from 1863 to 1865. Bowen was magistrate of Tazewell County, Virginia for several years prior to the Civil War and was presiding judge of the county court a portion of that time. He was elected a Democrat to the United States House of Representatives in 1872, serving from 1873 to 1875 and afterward resumed engagements in agricultural pursuits. Bowen died at his estate called "Maiden Spring" in Tazewell County, Virginia on August 29, 1879 and was interred in the family cemetery on the estate.

References

External links

Information on Rees Bowen

1809 births
1879 deaths
Democratic Party members of the Virginia House of Delegates
Virginia state court judges
Virginia lawyers
Democratic Party members of the United States House of Representatives from Virginia
People from Tazewell County, Virginia
19th-century American politicians
19th-century American lawyers
19th-century American judges
American slave owners